Anagnorisma eucratides is a moth in the family Noctuidae. It is found in the Hindu Kush Mountains in eastern Afghanistan at altitudes between 2,050 and 2,450 meters.

The ground colour of the forewings is brownish red.

References

Moths described in 1957
Noctuinae